Ultimate Tazer Ball, also known as UTB and UTB Live, is an extreme sport involving the use of stun devices.

Background
The sport, invented under the original name of Ultimate Tazer Ball by Leif Kellenberger, Eric Prum and Erik Wunsch, was first played in California. Two teams compete to get a large (24-inch diameter)  ball into goal at either end of the 200 x 85-foot field. Players on both teams are all armed with stun gun devices. Under the rules of the game players are allowed to use the stun guns on opposing players who are in possession of the ball. The devices used emit a current of three to five milliamps, sufficient to cause a localized muscle spasm but no permanent damage to any of the body's vital organs.

Safety
This is considered a dangerous sport that should not be taken lightly. Players must be registered and have someone standing by for medical assistance in case of injury.

Status
By 2013 UTB was widely considered as a thing of the past. No sizable UTB tournaments have been held since 2012. Furthermore, the official league website no longer exists.

References

External links
Archive version of the website homepage

Taser
Ball games